Tony Vannucci Roos (born 22 July 1977) is a French former snowboarder. He competed in the men's halfpipe event at the 1998 Winter Olympics.

References

External links
 

1977 births
Living people
French male snowboarders
Olympic snowboarders of France
Snowboarders at the 1998 Winter Olympics
Sportspeople from Bastia
20th-century French people